Rengsdorf is a municipality in the district of Neuwied, in Rhineland-Palatinate, Germany. It is situated in the Westerwald, approx. 10 km north of Neuwied.

Rengsdorf is the seat of the Verbandsgemeinde ("collective municipality") Rengsdorf-Waldbreitbach.

Today Rengsdorf is a regional well known  ("air spa") with popular forest walks. The Rheinsteig, a  hiking trail, also passes by the village.

Notable people
Fritz Henkel (1848–1930), founder of the Henkel Group
Norbert van Heyst (b. 1944), senior commander in the German Army and commander of the ISAF

References

Neuwied (district)